Sergio and Sergei is a 2017 Cuban drama film directed by Ernesto Daranas. It was selected as the Cuban entry for the Best Foreign Language Film at the 91st Academy Awards. However, it was not on the final list of submitted films released by Academy of Motion Picture Arts and Sciences in October 2018.

Plot
Sergio is a professor of Marxist philosophy at Havana. He is also a radio ham. His Jewish-American contact Peter sends him a modern radio. Through it, Sergio contacts and befriends Sergei, a Soviet cosmonaut in Mir space station. Meanwhile, a failed coup brings the end of the Soviet Union. Sergei has to wait until the new Russia can rescue him. Sergio endures the hardships of post-Soviet Cuba.

With the help of his balsero (raft building) building neighbor, Sergio distills moonshine and his mother makes cigars, so that his daughter Mariana has milk. Their informer neighbor Ramiro snitches to officer Lía about Sergio's illegalities. Sergei is concerned with the hardships suffered by his family in post-Soviet Russia and threatens to denounce them publicly. Sergio contacts Peter who pressures an FBI acquaintance.

Out of national pride, Russian president Boris Yeltsin orders Sergei's rescue. After the landing, Sergio and Sergei rejoice via radio. In a dreamlike-sequence, Ramiro breaks free of gravity and flies to Mir.

Cast
 Tomás Cao as Sergio, a Cuban professor and radio ham
 Héctor Noas as Sergei Asimov, a Soviet cosmonaut and radio ham
 Ron Perlman as Peter, an American radio ham

Reception
Sergio and Sergei has grossed a worldwide total of $23,268. On review aggregator website Rotten Tomatoes, the film holds an approval rating of 86% based on seven reviews, with an average rating of 5.5/10.

See also
 List of submissions to the 91st Academy Awards for Best Foreign Language Film
 List of Cuban submissions for the Academy Award for Best Foreign Language Film

References

External links
 
 
 Sergio & Serguei at Box Office Mojo

2017 films
2017 drama films
Cuban drama films
Films about astronauts
2010s Spanish-language films